This is a list of Norwegian television related events from 1985.

Events
4 May - Norway wins the 30th Eurovision Song Contest in Gothenburg, Sweden. The winning song is "La det swinge", performed by Bobbysocks!.

Debuts

Television shows

Ending this year

Births

Deaths

See also
1985 in Norway